Dana Miller may refer to:

Dana Miller, Liberal Party of Canada candidates, 2008 Canadian federal election#Delta—Richmond East
Dana Miller, character on List of Person of Interest episodes